The second season of the Mexican sitcom Una familia de diez premiered on August 25, 2019 and concluded on October 6, 2019 on Las Estrellas. Production of the season began on 8 January 2019.

After burning down the house they won in the season one finale, the López family is forced to return to the apartment where they lived before, now with two new members: Justito, son of Plutarco and Gaby, and Victoria, daughter of La Nena and Adolfo. The López family will live new troubles and problems, which will be solve with the support of the whole family.

Cast 
 Jorge Ortiz de Pinedo as Plácido López
 Eduardo Manzano as Don Arnoldo López
 Zully Keith as Renata González de López
 Andrea Torre as La Nena
 Mariana Botas as Martina López
 Moisés Iván Mora as Aldolfo
 Jessica Segura as Tecla
 María Fernanda García as Licha González
 Camila Rivas as Victoria
 Tadeo Bonavides as Justo "Justito" López
 Daniela Luján as Gaby del Valle de López
 Ricardo Margaleff as Plutarco López

Episodes

References 

2019 Mexican television seasons